Debedavan is a village in the Noyemberyan Municipality of the Tavush Province of Armenia, located near the Armenia–Georgia border. The village was populated by Azerbaijanis.

References

External links 

Populated places in Tavush Province